Geers' law is a phonological rule for Akkadian language according to which two different emphatic consonants (ṭ, ṣ, ḳ) cannot occur in one Akkadian word. It is named after Friedrich Geers who discovered it in 1945.

The law usually pertains to inherited Proto-Semitic roots whose emphatics were usually dissimilated. Compare:
 Proto-Semitic *ṣ̂bṭ > Akkadian ṣabātu "to seize"
 Proto-Semitic *ḳṭn > Akkadian ḳatānu "to be thin"
 Proto-Semitic *ḳṣr > Akkadian kaṣāru "to bind"
 Proto-Semitic *ṣ̂yḳ> Akkadian siāḳu "to be narrow"
Such dissimilation is more likely if the emphatics were glottalized.

It also affected loanwords, such as Amorite *qṭl > Akkadian ḳtl. In rare cases it did not apply, such as ḳaṣû instead of kaṣû.

If Proto-Semitic emphatics were ejectives, then the Geers' law is explained as a manifestation of the widespread constraint in languages having ejectives, which forbids cooccurrence of two ejectives in a root.

Notes

References
.
 
 
 

Akkadian language
Consonants
Sound laws